English singer Megan McKenna has released one studio album, one extended play, fourteen singles and three music videos. Her debut studio album, Story of Me, was released in December 2018. The album includes the singles "High Heeled Shoes", "History" and "Everything but You". In 2019, she won The X Factor: Celebrity, winning a record deal with Syco. In June 2022, McKenna announced that she had parted ways with Syco. She explained that they had heavily influenced her pop music releases as they had preferred them to the country songs McKenna had instead wanted to release. Following the departure, she announced that she would be independently releasing a song a week, beginning with the single "Baby Talk" on 24 June 2022.

Studio albums

Singles

As lead artist

As featured artist

Promotional singles

Other charted songs

Music videos

References

Country music discographies
Discographies of British artists